West Bengal Survey Institute, or WBSI, is a public technical education college located in Bandel, West Bengal. It is affiliated with West Bengal State Council of Technical Education (WBSCTE)  and approved by All India Council For Technical Education (AICTE). It provides Diploma level technical education to its students in Surveying, Civil Engineering and GIS-GPS Engineering. WBSI was established in 1947 with the intention of providing professional, technical and engineering education.

History
In the year 1914 a survey school was established at Maynamati (Comilla)now in Bangladesh and after independent major number of teaching & non-teaching staffs along some materials of noted institute left Maynamati to find its address at Bandel. For the time being it was shifted elsewhere; but soon it was rehabilitated at Bandel bearing name West Bengal Survey Institute (WBSI). Prior to 1991, WBSI was under the administration of West Bengal Government's "Land & Land Revenue Departments", and was awarding a 2-year trade certificate on Land Surveying. Binoy Choudhury, then land & land reform minister once visited the area and then he was interested to think for better utilisation of institute's land. Professor Narayan Ch Ghosh, closed to Choudhury, convinced him for its transformation to a higher level survey course training institute.  Binoy Choudhury took initiative and in the year 1988, the first ever Diploma in Survey Engineering was introduced and other courses were discontinued. Dr. Pradip K. Roy, then associate professor of Civil & Structural Engineering, Bengal Engineering and Science University, Shibpur was instrumental behind course formation. Later Professor Narayan Ch Ghosh was AICTE nominee in the Governing Body of West Bengal Survey Institute. Dr. N. C. Ghosh was proposer & Director of 1st National Seminar organised by West Bengal Survey Institute. Noted seminar was sponsored by funding agencies of Central Government of India & W.B. State Government. He took initiative for up-gradation of West Bengal Survey Institute to a degree level institute. He moved it to the All India Council for Technical Education (AICTE), met officials at Delhi and institute got 'letter of intent' from AICTE for Starting a degree level Survey Institute in the vast land of West Bengal Survey Institute introducing the B.Tech courses in i. Survey Engineering and ii. Town & Country Panning Engineering. Later though Diploma in Civil Engineering were introduced, starting of B.Tech courses did not materialized.

Campus
The campus of WBSI is located beside the G.T.Road in Bandel, West Bengal. WBSI also has the facilities of hostel, internet connection and seminar halls.
It has huge area of land available for further development and infrastructure is made available for new course of study.
The campus is designed in a systematic and scientific way. The course wares and training programmes are also regularly revised and updated to enable the students to stay in pace with the constant changes in the prevailing engineering market.

Survey Engineering Department
There is a total intake of 60 candidates each year in Survey Engineering department. On hand field practical and prescheduled off campus survey training camps is must for students. There are laboratories and workshops for other subjects taught.

Laboratories
 Survey Engineering Laboratory
 Civil Engineering Laboratory
 Cartography Laboratory
 Computer Laboratory
 Physics Laboratory
 Chemistry Laboratory
 Electrical Laboratory

External links
 Official Website

References

Education in West Bengal
Surveying of India
Technical universities and colleges in West Bengal
Surveying organizations
1947 establishments in West Bengal
Educational institutions established in 1947